Himanandakati is a village in Jhalokati District in the Barisal Division of southwestern Bangladesh.

References

Populated places in Jhalokati District